Rocketown Records was an independent record label which was started in 1996 by Michael W. Smith. In the fall of 1995, met with Don Donahue, A&R director at Reunion Records, to discuss creation of the label. 

In 1996, Word Records bought a minority share of the company.

Imprint
In 2006, Rocketown started the RKT Music imprint label to concentrate on a younger demographic. The first album released was Lifegiver by Hyper Static Union as a partnership between Rocketown and the Christian rock band Third Day. Hyper Static Union was signed to a production deal with Third Day's Consuming Fire Productions. Additional releases by RKT include Learning to Lose by the Turning and High Flight Society.

Roster 

 Alathea (active, currently independent)
 apt.core
 Christine Dente
 Ronnie Freeman
 Shaun Groves (active, currently independent)
 High Flight Society
 Hyper Static Union (active, with Amplitude Media)
 Geoff Moore
 Reuben Morgan (active, current worship pastor of Hillsong Church)
 Michael Olson (active)
 Michael W. Smith
 Out of the Grey (on hiatus)
 Ginny Owens (active)
 Chris Rice (active)
 George Rowe III
 Taylor Sorensen
 The Swift (disbanded in 2006)
 The Turning
 Watermark (inactive)
 Wilshire

See also 
 List of record labels

References

External links
 Official site

Record labels established in 1996
American independent record labels
Christian record labels
American companies established in 1996